Giovanni Girolamo de' Rossi or Giovan Girolamo de' Rossi was a Roman Catholic prelate who served as Bishop of Pavia (1550–1564) and (1530–1541).

Biography
On 3 Jun 1530, he was appointed during the papacy of Pope Clement VII as Bishop of Pavia where he served until his resignation in 1541.
On 22 Feb 1550, he was appointed during the papacy of Pope Julius III once again as Bishop of Pavia.
He served as Bishop of Pavia until his resignation on 4 Sep 1564.

References

External links and additional sources
 (for Chronology of Bishops)
 (for Chronology of Bishops)

16th-century Italian Roman Catholic bishops
Bishops appointed by Pope Clement VII
Bishops appointed by Pope Julius III